The eastern newt (Notophthalmus viridescens) is a common newt of eastern North America. It frequents small lakes, ponds, and streams or nearby wet forests. The eastern newt produces tetrodotoxin, which makes the species unpalatable to predatory fish and crayfish. These animals are common aquarium pets, being either collected from the wild or sold commercially. The striking bright orange juvenile stage, which is land-dwelling, is known as a red eft. Some sources blend the general name of the species and that of the red-spotted newt subspecies into the eastern red-spotted newt (although there is no "western" one).

Subspecies
The eastern newt includes these four subspecies:

Red-spotted newt (Notophthalmus viridescens viridescens)
Broken-striped newt (Notophthalmus viridescens dorsalis)
They are brown or green, with fine black dots all over the body. There may be a row of red spots on each side of the body. The belly is yellow or orange and is noticeably lighter than the rest of the body. The skin of newts is not as slippery as the skin of salamanders and may appear to be rough and dry for parts of their lives.
Peninsula newt (Notophthalmus viridescens piaropicola)

Life stages
Eastern newts have a lifespan of about 8-10 years in the wild, but some individuals have been known to live up to 15 years. Eastern newts have three stages of life: (1) the aquatic larva or tadpole, (2) the red eft or terrestrial juvenile stage, and (3) the aquatic adult.

Larva
The larva possesses gills and does not leave the pond environment where it was hatched. Larvae are brown-green, and shed their gills when they transform into the red eft.

Red eft
The red eft (juvenile) stage is a bright orangish-red, with darker red spots outlined in black. An eastern newt can have as many as 21 of these spots. The pattern of these spots differs among the subspecies. An eastern newt's time to get from larva to eft is about three months. During this stage, the eft may travel far, acting as a dispersal stage from one pond to another, ensuring outcrossing in the population. The striking coloration of this stage is an example of aposematism — or "warning coloration" — which is a type of antipredator adaptation in which a "warning signal" is associated with the unprofitability of a prey item (i.e., the saturation of the eft's tissues with tetrodotoxin) to potential predators.

Adult
After two or three years, the eft finds a pond and transforms into the aquatic adult. The adult's skin is a dull olive green dorsally, with a dull yellow belly, but retains the eft's characteristic black-rimmed red spots. It develops a larger, blade-like tail and characteristically slimy skin.

It is common for the peninsula newt (N. v. piaropicola) to be neotenic, with a larva transforming directly into a sexually mature aquatic adult, never losing its external gills. The red eft stage is in these cases skipped.

Habitat
Eastern newts are at home in both coniferous and deciduous forests. They need a moist environment with either a temporary or permanent body of water, and thrive best in a muddy environment. Eastern newts have a preference for certain types of habitats, with males preferring more open, aquatic habitats and females preferring more forested, terrestrial habitats. This preference may be related to the different roles that males and females play in the reproductive process, with males typically being more active in courtship and females spending more time on land preparing to lay eggs.

They may travel far from their original location during the eft stage. Red efts may often be seen in a forest after a rainstorm. Adults prefer a muddy aquatic habitat, but will move to land during a dry spell. Eastern newts have some amount of toxins in their skin, which is brightly colored to act as a warning. Even then, only 2% of larvae make it to the eft stage. Some larvae have been found in the pitchers of the carnivorous plant Sarracenia purpurea.

Diet 
Eastern newts are carnivorous, feeding on a variety of prey every two to three days. As larvae, they feed on small aquatic invertebrates, and as adults, they eat insects, worms, snails, and other small invertebrates. Eastern newts eat a variety of prey, such as insects, springtails, soil mites, small mollusks and crustaceans, young amphibians, worms, and frog eggs. They also eat a lot of snails, beetles, ants, and mosquito larvae, with an annual ingestion of about 35,000 kcal. Their dietary habits prove to be beneficial to humans because they help to control insect populations and maintain balance to their habitats. Eastern newts are a vital part of many ecosystems, serving as both predators and prey.

Behavior 
Eastern newts have a number of natural predators, including fish, snakes, birds, and larger salamanders. They have several defenses against these predators, including their bright coloring, which serves as a warning signal, and their ability to secrete toxins from their skin as a defense mechanism.

Adaptability 
Eastern newts are highly sensitive to changes in their environment and are able to detect and respond to changes in water quality and temperature. This sensitivity allows them to thrive in a variety of habitats, but it also makes them vulnerable to environmental changes and pollution. In fact, eastern newts are considered a sensitive species, meaning that they are often used as indicators of ecosystem health. When populations of eastern newts decline, it can be a sign of environmental stress or degradation.

Hibernation 
Eastern newts are ectothermic, relying on external sources of heat to regulate their body temperature. They are most active during the warmer months of the year, but they can also be found in more temperate climates where they may be active year-round. During the winter months, some eastern newts will often burrow underground or seek shelter in logs or other debris to avoid the cold. However, studies have shown that some do not engage in hibernation, depending on the location of the species.

Homing 
Eastern newts home using magnetic orientation. Their magnetoreception system seems to be a hybrid of polarity-based inclination and a sun-dependent compass. Shoreward-bound eastern newts will orient themselves quite differently under light with wavelengths around 400 nm than light with wavelengths around 600 nm, while homing newts will orient themselves the same way under both short and long wavelengths. Ferromagnetic material, probably biogenic magnetite, is likely present in the eastern newt's body.

A study determined that the home range size for Eastern newts is primarily affected by food availability, substrate humidity, but not affected by dispersal ability, competition, shelter availability, or predator avoidance. Distance travelled depended on humidity and precipitation. The mean distance traveled overnight was about 15 m, with longest trails ranging over 70 m.

Reproduction 
Eastern newts breed once per year, when breeding starts in late fall until early spring. They are known to be polygynandrous, with females and males mating with multiple partners. Males have preference towards larger females, while no evidence for female preference during mating was found. The breeding migration often happens more with rainfall. The male's spots attract females, luring them to him with fanning motions of his tail, causing a pheromone to be released. Once the female has chosen a mate, the male will deposit a spermatophore, a package of sperm, onto the ground, which the female will then pick up and fertilize her eggs with. The female will lay her eggs in the water, attaching them to submerged vegetation or other objects. 200~400 eggs are laid in a single batch, with incubation period of 3~8 weeks.

Social interactions 
The behavior of eastern newts is also influenced by their social interactions with other members of their species. Eastern newts exhibit social hierarchy, with dominant individuals exhibiting aggressive behaviors towards subordinates. This social hierarchy is thought to be related to the distribution of resources, with dominant individuals having access to more food and better mating opportunities. One such behavior is territoriality, where individuals will defend a specific area or resource from other members of their species. This behavior is commonly seen in males during the breeding season, when they will defend a territory in order to attract females and ensure access to mating opportunities.

Survival advantages
Secretion of toxins through the skin protects the newt from predators, and should therefore not be handled with bare hands. The red colors of the adult newt also act as a warning sign for predators. Its ventral surface has poison glands, which makes predators reluctant to eat it. This special toxin is known as tetrodotoxin. Several studies have found that newt larvae increase the production of this toxin while in the presence of predators (dragonflies). Tetrodotoxin is known to cause muscle paralysis, skin irritation, and even death in predators. The Eastern newt also has a greater tail depth and is capable of swimming quickly away from aquatic predators.

Limb regeneration
Eastern newts are able to regenerate their limbs that were lost to an injury. Forelimb regeneration has been considered to be close to the forelimb development; genes that play a role in forelimb regeneration are known to also be expressed in its developmental stages. In addition. they are capable of regenerating their spinal cord, heart, and other organs. This ability is thought to be related to their high levels of stem cells, which allow them to repair and regenerate damaged tissues.

Conservation concerns
Although eastern newts are widespread throughout North America, they, like many other species of amphibians, are increasingly threatened by several factors including habitat fragmentation, climate change, invasive species, over-exploitation, and emergent infectious diseases. The biodiversity of amphibians across the United States is considered to be threatened due to the loss of wetlands and furthermore, their connectivity; since the 1780s, more than 53% of wetlands in the United States have been lost. For example, a study found the toxicity of coal-tar pavement on eastern newts sublethal, decreasing their righting ability and swimming speed. Wild eastern newts are known hosts of Batrachochytrium dendrobatidis and Ranavirus. They are also highly susceptible to the newly emergent chytrid fungus Batrachochytrium salamandrivorans.

Gallery

References

Citations

Further reading

External links

Notophthalmus viridescens. Animal Diversity Web.
Eastern Newt (Notophthalmus viridescens. Checklist of Amphibian Species and Identification Guide. USGS Northern Prairie Wildlife Research Center.
Red-spotted Newt (Notophthalmus viridescens viridescens). Virginia Department of Game and Inland Fisheries.
Eastern Newt Caresheet and Photos. Caudata Culture.
Notophthalmus viridescens Species Account. AmphibiaWeb.
Central Newt on Reptiles and Amphibians of Iowa

Amphibians of Canada
Amphibians of the United States
Amphibians described in 1820
Cenozoic amphibians of North America
Ecology of the Appalachian Mountains
Extant Pleistocene first appearances
Fauna of the Great Lakes region (North America)
Fauna of the Northeastern United States
Fauna of the Plains-Midwest (United States)
Fauna of the Southeastern United States
Newts
Pleistocene animals of North America
Pleistocene United States
Taxa named by Constantine Samuel Rafinesque